Saint Neophytos Monastery lies in the territory of the community of Tala, 1 km north of the village, and 15 km west of Paphos, is one of the best-known monasteries in Cyprus. It was founded by monk Neophytos in the 12th century. The property is currently a museum consisting of the Engleistra (Place of Seclusion, built in a natural cave, with a small chapel) and the Monastery. Agios Neofytos lies 4 km west of Tremithousa, and across the steep valley from the Tsiárta mountain.

History 
The Agios Neophytos Monastery was founded by Neophytos. After being jailed for pursuing an ascetic life, he fled into the hills of Cyprus and found a small natural cave in 1159. Months passed while he made sure the area was deserted and quiet. He slowly excavated the opening further to encompass his hermitage cell, a small chapel, and his eventual tomb. While it began as a hermitage for Neophytos alone, he eventually gained a small following and the Engleistra, as it was also called, became a quiet monastic community in 1170 when the Bishop of Paphos convinced him to take a pupil. Neophytos was staunchly against materialism and being bothered, which kept the population of monks much smaller than at other monasteries of the time. In his second Ritual Ordinance, he states that the number of monks was around fifteen or eighteen.

After, his death, he was buried within the Engleistra according to his own detailed instructions. His successor, Isaias, is mentioned in the writings of Neophytos, but nothing is known about his time as abbot, nor is there any information about any other abbots during the 13th, 14th, or 15th centuries. However, it is speculated that the heads of the monastery following Neophytos did not hold to his isolationist lifestyle. The monastery was expanded and new paintings and decorations were added over the centuries, although not very often. One major overhaul was undertaken by another monk named Neophytos in 1503, who ordered the renovation of several original artworks as well as additional new icons, all paid for with his own money. The community fluctuated between growth and decline for several centuries, but became stagnant around the seventeenth century. In 1631, after the abbot Leontios set about to preclude its dissolution, it was declared to have precedence over all other monasteries on Cyprus by the Patriarch Cyril Loukaris from Constantinople. Over the last several centuries, the monastery and its buildings were often repaired and expanded upon to keep them from being lost to time. It continues to be inhabited to this day and the monks within promote the publication of historical manuscripts written within their walls in order to preserve their history. Hallows of Neophytos were found in 1756 and then were placed in the main church of the monastery.

Architecture 

The original Engleistra of Saint Neophytos consists of three parts: the church of the True Cross, the cell of Neophytos, and the Refectory. All three are carved into the steep rock face where Neophytos first wished to settle as a hermit. A large trapezoidal narthex lies at the entrance of the Engleistra, followed by the refectory on the north side and the cell on the south. The main body of the church and the bema are covered with wall paintings from throughout the history of the monastery. The eastern wall has a moderately sized cross-shaped niche which once housed a wooden cross that contained a piece of the True Cross, which was obtained by the founder Neophytos.

Outside of the Engleistra sits the main church of the monastery, the katholikon. It is a large Venetian-inspired basilica that appears to have been built sometime during the early 16th century. It too was decorated with wall paintings, although very few of them have survived to this day. Currently the monastery also houses a museum, which exists to educate visitors on the history of the monastic community and showcases many icons and manuscripts.

Paintings 
The majority of the paintings completed in the original Engleistra portion of the monastery during Neophytos’ life were done by Theodore Apsuedes in 1183, as mentioned in the saint’s writings and a surviving inscription in his cell. The further reaches of the monastery that were also painted in the twelfth century were completed later, most likely sometime after 1197. There are stylistic differences between the two areas that suggest it was painted by artists with varying backgrounds. Most of the paintings in the Engleistra follow traditional Byzantine church decoration like the Crucifixion and the Annunciation. However, there are some interesting deviations from the normal frescoes expected within. One scene depicts the founder, Neophytos, alongside the archangels Michael and Gabriel at the very top of the ceiling. Another, verging on blasphemous, shows the monk attending a divine service within the mandorla of Christ. Neophytos is described as being a vain individual, which may explain why so many of the paintings outside of Biblical scenes seem to be monuments to his life and accomplishments.

A noninvasive study on the multitude of paintings adorning the walls of the monastery show that there were at least five phases of painting done over the history of the Engleistra. Many of the pigments used contained high levels of lead, which suggests that the artists were trained in painting icons on wood, and not painting frescoes on walls. Many expensive pigments were also found, such as lapis lazuli, gold, and silver. These findings link the monastery to direct Byzantine influence in the fine arts, on top of the political influence due to Cyprus being under the control of Turks during the time of the majority of the paintings.

References 

 Epstein, Ann Wharton. “Formulas for Salvation: A Comparison of Two Byzantine Monasteries and Their Founders.” Church History, vol. 50, no. 4, 1981, pp. 385–400.
 Kakouilli, Ioanna and Christian Fischer. An Innovative Noninvasive and Nondestructive Multidisciplinary Approach for the Technical Study of the Byzantine Wall Paintings in the Enkleistra of St. Neophytos in Paphos, Cyprus. Project Grant, University of California, 2009. 
 Mango, Cyril, and Ernest J. W. Hawkins. “The Hermitage of St. Neophytos and Its Wall Paintings.” Dumbarton Oaks Papers, vol. 20, 1966, pp. 119–206.
 Papageōrgiou, Athanasios. The Monastery of Agios Neophytos : history and art (a short guide).

External links

 Information from the official website of the Church of Cyprus (in Greek)

Cypriot Orthodox monasteries
Historic sites in Cyprus
1159 establishments
Religious organizations established in the 1150s
Buildings and structures in Paphos District